Nectogalini is a tribe of Old World water shrews within the family Soricidae.  As of late 2007, it consisted of six extant genera and 25 species, with some of the latter being further divided into subspecies.

Adaptation to semiaquatic life
Members of this tribe that are associated with a semiaquatic mode of life have developed several lifestyle adaptations.  For example, some species in the genera Chimarrogale, Nectogale, Neomys,  and Sorex have stiff hairs on the sides of their toes and feet, both on their fore and hind limbs.  These increase the surface area of the feet, assisting in locomotion during swimming.  In addition, species such as Neomys fodiens have developed elongated tails with the hairs forming a keel-like shape that is similar in function to a rudder when the animal is in the water.

Genera

 Chimarrogale (6 species)
 Chodsigoa (10 species)
 Episoriculus (4 species)
 Nectogale (monotypic)
 Neomys (3 species)
 Soriculus (monotypic)
 †Asoriculus (4 species)
 †Nesiotites (4 species)

References

Red-toothed shrews
Mammal tribes